Shoya Ichihashi (born November 5, 1997) is a Japanese pair skater. With his skating partner, Miyu Yunoki, he is the 2022 Japanese national champion.

With his former partner, Riku Miura, he has represented Japan at four ISU Championships. The two finished tenth at the 2018 Four Continents Championships in Taipei, Taiwan, and at the 2018 World Junior Championships in Sofia, Bulgaria.

Programs 
(with Yunoki)

(with Miura)

Competitive highlights 
CS: Challenger Series; JGP: Junior Grand Prix

Pairs with Yunoki

Pairs with Miura

Men's singles

References

External links 

 

1997 births
Japanese male pair skaters
Kansai University alumni
Living people
Sportspeople from Hiroshima